M. K. Selvaraju is an Indian politician and incumbent member of the Tamil Nadu Legislative Assembly from the Salem South constituency. He represents the Anna Dravida Munnetra Kazhagam party.

References 

2.http://www.tamilnadumlas.com/candidate.php?mlaid=39

Members of the Tamil Nadu Legislative Assembly
All India Anna Dravida Munnetra Kazhagam politicians
Living people
Year of birth missing (living people)